Newark Days is an annual celebration that takes place in Newark, California every September to celebrate the incorporation of the city of Newark on September 22, 1955. In its current form it is a four-day event, Thursday through Sunday, in mid to late September. It is centered on Newark Community Park & Community Center as well as the adjacent MacGregor School Grounds. In addition to carnival rides, food and game booths, and stage shows, it includes a race and a parade along "the Newark Mile" (a stretch of Newark Blvd.) on the Saturday morning. Annual attendance for the celebration is more than 100,000.

History 

What is now called Newark Days was originally planned by members of the Newark Chamber of Commerce. They later turned the festivities over to the Jaycees. In the 1960s a group called "Newark Birthday Celebration" was formed. However, the event was not put on during the late 1960s. 

In 1972, Shirley Sisk called a meeting to see if there were enough volunteers to plan an event for that September. Interest was high, and "Newark Days Celebration" was formed. The Newark Rotary club brought in a carnival, and the committee put together food booths and games at the Pavilion. The weekend was a huge success, and a nonprofit corporation was formed to make it a regular annual event. A volunteer 30-member committee works year-round to organize it, and more than 200 volunteers assist at the event.

In 2005, Newark Days celebrated Newark's 50th anniversary with a 1950s theme and the return of Arknew, a kangaroo that was Newark's old town mascot.

The festival was held virtually in 2020 due to concerns around COVID-19. The 2021 celebration was cancelled just weeks before the event due to increasing infection numbers from the COVID Delta variant. Newark Days returned in 2022 with a full in-person festival.

Themes 
Every year, the Newark Days Celebration features a different theme.

1988	Every Day's a Holiday
1989	People, Pride & Progress 
1990	The Magic of Newark
1991	Newark Then & Now
1992	Where Fairy Tales Come True
1993	Railroad Days
1994	The Best of the West
1995	Remembering When
1996	There's No Place Like Home
1997	It's a Small World
1998	Under the Big Top
1999	Every Day's a Holiday
2000	The Sounds of Music
2001	Newarks of the World
2002	Celebrate America
2003	Every Day's a Holiday
2004	Exploring the West
2005	50 Golden Years
2006	It's all Here
2007	Cirque de Newark
2008	Celebrate America
2009	Celebrating the Arts
2010	Color the World
2011	Fantasy Comes Alive
2012   Country Jamboree
 2013	All That Jazz
 2014  Be a Kid Again
 2015	Set Sail for Newark
 2016	Voyage to the Stars
 2017	A Jungle Adventure
 2018	It's a Wizard's World 
 2019  Heros Are Super
 2020  Celebrate Virtually
 2021  (Cancelled due to COVID Delta Variant)
 2022  Under the Sea
 2023  Newark Rocks!

External links

 Newark Days Official Website
 Newark Mile Official Website

References 

Tourist attractions in Alameda County, California
Festivals in the San Francisco Bay Area
Newark, California